The 2014/15 FIS Ski Jumping Continental Cup was the 23rd in a row (21st official) Continental Cup winter season in ski jumping for men and the 10th for ladies. This was also the 12th summer continental cup season for men and 6th for ladies.

Lower competitive circuits this season included the World Cup, Grand Prix and Alpen Cup.

Men

Summer

Winter

Ladies

Summer

Winter

Men's standings

Summer

Winter

Overall (summer + winter)

Ladies' standings

Summer

Winter

Overall (summer + winter)

Europa Cup vs. Continental Cup 
Last two seasons of Europa Cup in 1991/92 and 1992/93 are recognized as first two Continental Cup seasons by International Ski Federation, although Continental Cup under this name officially started first season in 1993/94 season.

References

FIS Ski Jumping Continental Cup
2013 in ski jumping
2014 in ski jumping

de:Skisprung-Continental-Cup 2013/14
pl:Puchar Kontynentalny w skokach narciarskich 2013/2014